FabricLive.16 is a DJ mix compilation album by Adam Freeland, as part of the FabricLive Mix Series.

Track listing
  Black Rebel Motorcycle Club – Loveburns – Virgin
  Proper Filthy Naughty – Flow (False Prophet Remix) – 10Kilo
  2 tracks mixed:
  Evil Nine – Hired Goons – Marine Parade
  Freeland – Heel 'n' Toe (Acapella) – Marine Parade
  Precision Cuts – Xylophone – Simple
  Evil Nine – Crooked – Marine Parade
  2 tracks mixed:
  Pet – Super Pet (Evil Nine Mix) – Groenland
  Freeland – We Want Your Soul (Acapella) – Marine Parade
  Justice Vs Gambit – Steamulation – Ed Banger Records
  Bassbin Twins – Sqsh – Bassbin
  M.A.N.D.Y. – Words Don't Come Easy – Get Physical
  Freeland – Burn The Clock – Marine Parade
  UNKLE – Reign (Evil Nine Mix) – Island
  Adam Freeland and The Soul Drummers – F-Groove – Marine Parade
  Telemen – In All Nothing (Adam Freeland & Evil Nine Mix) – Good Groove
  LFO – Freak – Warp
  Freeland – Mind Killer (Origin Unknown Mix) – Marine Parade
  Radioactive Man – Airlock – Geist/Rotters Golf Club

External links
Fabric: FabricLive.16

Adam Freeland albums
2004 compilation albums